Anatomy of a Scandal is an American thriller drama streaming television miniseries developed by David E. Kelley and Melissa James Gibson, based on the novel of the same name by Sarah Vaughan. The series consists of six episodes, and premiered on Netflix on April 15, 2022.

Premise
Sophie Whitehouse, the wife of British Tory MP James Whitehouse, learns that her husband has been having an affair with an aide, Olivia Lytton. The news goes public, blowing up their lives and forcing her to deal with the consequences of her husband's disastrous actions. To make matters worse, James is accused of raping Olivia and has to stand trial.

Cast and characters

Main
 Sienna Miller as Sophie Whitehouse, James's wife
 Hannah Dodd portrays a young Sophie Whitehouse (then: Sophie Greenaway)
 Michelle Dockery as Kate Woodcroft , prosecution counsel tasked with James's case
 Nancy Farino portrays a young Kate Woodcroft, then named Holly Berry
 Rupert Friend as James Whitehouse , Home Office minister and close friend to the Prime Minister
 Ben Radcliffe portrays a young James Whitehouse
 Naomi Scott as Olivia Lytton, parliamentary researcher on James's staff, who has an affair with him and later accuses him of rape
 Joshua McGuire as Chris Clarke, Downing Street communications chief
 Josette Simon as Angela Regan , James's defense counsel

Recurring

 Jonathan Firth as Richard, Kate's married former pupil master, with whom she is having an affair
 Sebastian Selwood as Finn Whitehouse, Sophie and James's son
 Amelie Bea Smith as Emily Whitehouse, Sophie and James's daughter
 Geoffrey Streatfeild as Tom Southern , the Prime Minister
 Jake Simmance portrays a young Tom Southern
 Violet Verigo as Krystyna, the Whitehouses' Russian au pair
 Liz White as Ali, a schoolteacher and Kate's best friend 
 Tom Turner as John Vestey
 Jonathan Coy as Aled Luckhurst, the judge of James's rape case
 Kudzai Sitima as Maggie, Kate's pupil

Guest
 Richard McCabe as Brian Taylor
 Rosalie Craig as Lucy
 Anna Madeley as Ellie Frisk, a friend of Sophie's
 Edmund Kingsley as Mark Frisk, Ellie's husband
 Maggie Steed as Sybil Murray, one of James's constituents
 Luka Sheppard as Alec Fisher, a classmate of James and Tom at Oxford
 Jane How as Madame Speaker
 Clive Francis as Lawrence Hughes-Davies 
 Adrian Lukis as Aitkin, Leader of the Opposition
 Kathryn Wilder as Kitty Ledger, Olivia's friend and co-worker
 Phoebe Nicholls as Tuppence Whitehouse, James's mother

Episodes

Production

Netflix announced in May 2020 they had greenlit the series, which David E. Kelley and Melissa James Gibson adapted from the Sarah Vaughan novel of the same name. S. J. Clarkson was set to direct all episodes of the series. In September, Sienna Miller, Michelle Dockery, and Rupert Friend were cast to star in the series. Naomi Scott would be added in December, with Ben Radcliffe booking a recurring role in January 2021.

Filming for the series began in October 2020 at Shepperton Studios. Filming also took place at St. George's Hanover Square Primary School in Mayfair, London. Production took place in Oxford in February 2021.

Reception
The review aggregator website Rotten Tomatoes reported a 60% approval rating with an average rating of 5.9/10, based on 42 critic reviews. The website's critics consensus reads, "Anatomy of a Scandal has the bones of a good David E. Kelley potboiler but lacks the connective tissue to really work, although the starry cast provides an intrigue all its own." Metacritic, which uses a weighted average, assigned a score of 52 out of 100 based on 20 critics, indicating "mixed or average reviews".  Anatomy of a Scandal was in the Netflix Global Top 10 for most watched English language series for five weeks, holding the number one position in its second week.

References

External links
 
 

2020s American drama television miniseries
2022 American television series debuts
2022 American television series endings
Adultery in television
American thriller television series
Courtroom drama television series
English-language Netflix original programming
Political thriller television series
Psychological thriller television series
Television series by Made Up Stories
Television series created by David E. Kelley
Television shows based on British novels
Television shows directed by S. J. Clarkson
Television shows filmed in England
Television shows set in London